Daniel John Bigham (born 2 October 1991) is a British racing cyclist, who rode for UCI Continental team  from 2018 until 2021. He rode in the men's individual pursuit event at the 2018 UCI Track Cycling World Championships.

Starting in 2022, he also works for Ineos Grenadiers as a performance engineer, helping the riders on the team improve their aerodynamic performance. At the 2022 British National Track Championships in Newport, Wales he won another British title after winning the pursuit title.

Alongside Charlie Tanfield, Ethan Vernon and Oliver Wood, Bigham won silver in the team pursuit at the 2022 Commonwealth Games.

Hour record
On 1 October 2021 Bigham rode  at the Tissot Velodrome in Grenchen (Switzerland) to break Bradley Wiggins's British national hour record. He was ineligible to attempt the UCI record because he was not enrolled in the UCI's Registered Testing Pool anti-doping system, including a biological passport. While all World Tour riders and ProTeam riders are in the testing pool, Bigham estimated it would cost him £8,000 to join as an individual.

On August 19, 2022 Bigham broke the hour record with a distance of 55.548 km at the Grenchen Velodrome in Switzerland. Bigham held the record for just shy of two months; Filippo Ganna registered 56.792 km in October 2022, surpassing Bigham's mark by more than 1 km. Bigham was a central part of the team in Ganna's attempt,  using the engineering knowledge he had developed in his own record to aid Ganna.

Personal life
Bigham's partner is fellow cyclist Joss Lowden, former holder of the women's hour record.

Major results

2016
 3rd Beaumont Trophy
2017
 National Track Championships
1st  Individual pursuit
1st  Kilo
1st  Team pursuit
 1st Team pursuit, UCI Track World Cup, Minsk
2018
 1st Team pursuit, UCI Track World Cup, London
 2nd Individual pursuit, National Track Championships
2019
 National Track Championships
1st  Team pursuit
2nd Individual pursuit
 3rd  Team relay, UCI Road World Championships
 4th Beaumont Trophy
 5th Time trial, National Road Championships
2020
 National Track Championships
1st  Team pursuit
2nd Kilo
3rd Individual pursuit
2021
 British hour record: 54.723 km
 2nd Time trial, National Road Championships
2022
 Hour record: 55.548 km
 1st  Team pursuit, UCI Track World Championships
 1st  Individual pursuit, National Track Championships
 2nd  Team pursuit, Commonwealth Games
 2nd Time trial, National Road Championships
2023
 UEC European Track Championships
2nd  Individual pursuit
2nd  Team pursuit

References

External links
 

1991 births
Living people
British male cyclists
Sportspeople from Newcastle-under-Lyme
Cyclists at the 2022 Commonwealth Games
Commonwealth Games competitors for England
Commonwealth Games silver medallists for England
Commonwealth Games medallists in cycling
20th-century British people
21st-century British people
UCI Track Cycling World Champions (men)
Medallists at the 2022 Commonwealth Games